The Women's EHF European League is an annual competition for women's handball clubs of Europe. It is organized by the EHF. It is currently the second-tier competition of European club handball, ranking only below the EHF Champions League.

Previously called the Women's EHF Cup, the competition will be known as the Women's EHF European League from the 2020–21 season.

History
The first edition took place in 1981. It was called the IHF Cup until 1993. From the 2016–17 season, the competition merged with the EHF Cup Winners' Cup.

Tournament structure
The EHF Cup is a competition divided into seven rounds: Round 1, Round 2, Round 3, Group Phase, Quarter-finals, Semi-finals and Final.

Summary

Women's IHF Cup

Women's EHF Cup

Women's EHF European League

Statistics

By club

By country

See also
 EHF European League
 Women's EHF Champions League

References

External links 
 

 
European Handball Federation competitions
Women's handball competitions
Recurring sporting events established in 1981
Multi-national professional sports leagues